Colombo Library may refer to:
Colombo Public Library, the largest public library in Sri Lanka
University of Colombo library, a university library on the campus of the University of Colombo, also in Sri Lanka.

Disambiguation pages